Filenadol (INN; Filantor; FI-2024) is an analgesic drug with antinociceptive and antiinflammatory properties.

References

Secondary alcohols
Analgesics
Benzodioxoles
4-Morpholinyl compunds